Charles Fisher (December 5, 1865unknown) was a Canadian politician. He served on the North-West Legislative Assembly for Batoche from 1898 to 1905.

Early life 
Charles Fisher was born on December 5, 1965 to George Fisher (1830–1898) and Emily Boyer in Manitoba. He was educated at Université de Saint-Boniface and St. John's College. He married Louise Brabant on February 10, 1887.

Political life 
Fisher contested the 1898 North-West Territories general election in the Batoche, defeating incumbent Charles Eugene Boucher, 76 votes to 54. Fisher was re-elected in the 1902 North-West Territories general election, defeating Jean Baptiste Boucher, 174 votes to 109.

References 

1865 births
Members of the Legislative Assembly of the Northwest Territories
Year of death missing